The Kabelske is a river in the German states of Saxony and Saxony-Anhalt. It is a left tributary of the Reide, and flows through the counties of Nordsachsen and Saalekreis, as well as the eastern part of the borough of Halle (Saale) in southern Saxony-Anhalt.

Its source is a reservoir on the western edge of Leipzig-Halle Airport in the cadastral municipality of Schkeuditz in Nordsachsen. It then flows northwest, passes under the A 9 motorway and the Erfurt–Leipzig/Halle high-speed railway line near Gröbers.

The Reide, in turn, discharges into the White Elster near  after another .

See also 
List of rivers of Saxony
List of rivers of Saxony-Anhalt

References

Literature 
 

Rivers of Saxony
Rivers of Saxony-Anhalt
Rivers of Germany